True Romance is Yukari Tamura's first compilation album, released on March 5, 2003.

Track listing
 Angel Pride – 3:34
 Lyrics: Yukiko Mitsui
 Composition: cota
 Arrangement: Mitsutoshi Hirose
 Opening theme song for 
 Love Countdown – 3:58
 Lyrics: Kakeru Saegusa
 Arrangement and composition: Kazuhisa Yamaguchi
 WE CAN FLY ～solo fight～ – 4:49
 Lyrics: Meg
 Arrangement and composition: Motoyoshi Iwasaki
  – 4:46
 Lyrics: Mitsuko Shiramine
 Arrangement: Yuuko Asai
 Composition: Ryou Yonemitsu
 DAYDREAM – 4:23
 Lyrics: Kakeru Saegusa
 Arrangement and composition: Kazuhisa Yamaguchi
  – 4:42
 Lyrics: Karen Shiina
 Composition: MIZUKI
 Arrangement: Ryou Yonemitsu
 Sweetest Love – 5:16
 Lyrics and composition: marhy
 Arrangement: Motoyoshi Iwasaki
 Sparkle with delight – 5:48
 Lyrics: Kakeru Saegusa
 Arrangement and composition: Kazuhisa Yamaguchi
 CATCH MY EYES – 5:25
 Lyrics: Mitsuko Shiramine
 Composition: Toshiaki Yamazaki
 Arrangement: Ryou Yonemitsu
  – 5:42
 Lyrics, arrangement and composition: Chiyomaru Shikura
 My Life is Great – 3:42
 Lyrics: Karen Shiina
 Arrangement and composition: Mitsutoshi Hirose
  – 4:45
 Lyrics: Kakeru Saegusa
 Arrangement and composition: Kazuhisa Yamaguchi
  – 4:42
 Lyrics: Shun Taguchi
 Composition: Takahiro Koike
 Arrangement: Masafumi Miyokawa
 Trust me, trust you～Yukari Version～ – 4:21
 Lyrics, arrangement and composition: Yuki Matsuura
  – 4:15
 Lyrics: Karen Shiina
 Composition: cota
 Arrangement: Mitsutoshi Hirose
 Ending theme song for

References 

Yukari Tamura albums
2003 greatest hits albums